Béla Zsedényi de Lőcse (5 April 1894 – 8 February 1955) was a Hungarian jurist and politician, who served as Speaker of the Provisional National Assembly of Hungary between 1944 and 1945. He was a member of the High National Council due to his office.

References
 Dobrossy István–Eszenyi Miklós–Zahuczky László: Miskolci életrajzi lexikon. Miskolc, 2008.
 Az 1956-os forradalom történetének dokumentációs és kutatóintézete közalapítvány
Életrajza az 1945-1947-es Országgyűlés Almanachjában

1894 births
1955 deaths
People from Maramureș County
People from the Kingdom of Hungary
Hungarian Independence Party politicians
Speakers of the National Assembly of Hungary
Members of the National Assembly of Hungary (1945–1947)
Hungarian jurists
Hungarian academics
Hungarian prisoners sentenced to life imprisonment
Prisoners sentenced to life imprisonment by Hungary
Hungarian politicians convicted of crimes
Hungarian people who died in prison custody